Marion Township is a township in Lee County, Iowa.

History
Marion Township was organized in 1841.

References

Townships in Lee County, Iowa
Townships in Iowa